Hossein Baghlani is an Iranian footballer who plays for Sanat Naft Abadan in the Persian Gulf Pro League.

Club career

Sanat Naft Abadan
At the age of 20, Baghlani was signed by Sanat Naft Abadan directly from the youth teams. He scored his first professional goal on 15 October 2011 in a 1–1 draw against Shahin Bushehr. After Sanat Naft was relegated to the Azadegan League in 2013, Baghlani extended his contract and decided to play in the lower division with Sanat Naft.

In 2016 with the help of six goals from Baghlani and after a three-year absence from the Persian Gulf Pro League, Sanat Naft was once again promoted to the top flight.

References

Living people
Persian Gulf Pro League players
Sanat Naft Abadan F.C. players
Iranian footballers
1990 births
Association football defenders